Yuki Anggraini Kato or better known as Yuki Kato (born 2 April 1995) is an Indonesian actress, model, and television presenter of mixed Javanese and Japanese descent.

In addition to acting, she also has an interest in singing, and she performed the song "My Heart OST" with Irshadi Bagas on the show My Heart by Request on SCTV. In 2010, she starred in the film Arti Sahabat alongside Steven William. In 2013, Yuki acted in the film Operation Wedding with Adipati Dolken. She also sang on the soundtrack for the film.

Biography
Yuki Kato is the eldest daughter of the Japanese-Indonesian couple Twinawati and Takeshi Kato. Takeshi Kato is a project manager of a big company in Japan and currently resides there. Yuki has two younger sisters named Reina Meisilia Kato and Sakura Des Caesar Kato. They live in Kota Wisata, Cibubur, East Jakarta.

Education
Yuki Kato is an alumnus of Fajar Hidayah Elementary School, Pilar Indonesia Junior High School,  and Bakti Mulya 400 High School. As of 2017, she was working towards a degree in International Relations from the University of Indonesia.

Filmography

Film

Television
Television film

Television series

Awards and nominations

References

External links
 
 

1995 births
21st-century Indonesian actresses
Actresses of Japanese descent
Indonesian female models
Indonesian film actresses
Indonesian people of Japanese descent
Javanese people
Indonesian Muslims
Indonesian television actresses
Living people
People from Malang